Robert McCulley (born 2 December 1951 in Glasgow) is a Scottish former football player and manager.

References

Sources
 

1952 births
Living people
Footballers from Glasgow
Scottish footballers
Association football midfielders
Hamilton Academical F.C. players
East Stirlingshire F.C. players
Ayr United F.C. players
Dumbarton F.C. players
Falkirk F.C. players
Stirling Albion F.C. players
St Roch's F.C. players
Glasgow United F.C. players
Scottish Football League players
Scottish Junior Football Association players
Association football coaches
Airdrieonians F.C. (1878) non-playing staff
St Mirren F.C. non-playing staff
Scottish football managers
East Stirlingshire F.C. managers
Scottish Football League managers